In the Battle of Bosra (Spring 1147) a Crusader force commanded by King Baldwin III of Jerusalem fought an inconclusive running battle with Turkish forces from Damascus led by Mu'in ad-Din Unur aided by Nur ad-Din's contingent from Mosul and Aleppo. Irritated by his Damascus overlord, the emir of Bosra and Salkhad invited the Crusaders to occupy the two places. Before the Latin army could take possession of Bosra, the emir's wife allowed a Damascene garrison into the city. The thwarted Crusaders returned to their own territory. The Turks constantly harassed the Latin marching column but were unable to inflict a defeat on their enemies.

Background
In the spring of 1147, Altuntash, the emir of Bosra and Salkhad squabbled with his nominal superior, Mu'in ad-Din Unur, ruler of Damascus. Offended, Altuntash allied himself with the Crusaders and agreed to hand over his two cities. Though the seizure of Bosra and Salkhad meant breaking a treaty with Damascus and the likelihood of resistance from the Damascus army as well as from Nur ad-Din, King Baldwin III led his army toward Bosra.

Running battle
Soon after the Crusader march began, the Damascene army showed up in great strength to contest their advance. Many Latin soldiers were eager for battle, but more cautious heads prevailed. Posting extra guards to watch for a surprise attack, the Frankish army made camp and spent the night. After a council of war the next day, Baldwin and his officers determined to continue the expedition to Bosra in a fighting march. The Latin army moved in the usual formation when opposed by an army of Turkish horse archers. Provision was made to oppose attacks on the van, the flanks and the rear. The Frankish foot soldiers marched in close formation with foot archers ready to fire back at the Turkish horse archers and spearmen ready to repel a direct attack. "In order to maintain the solidity of the column, the pace of the mounted troops was made to conform to that of the infantry."

For four days, the Crusaders advanced toward their intended goal, under constant archery and probing attacks. Further, the soldiers were bedeviled by thirst in the hot summer weather. When they arrived at Bosra, the Franks managed to obtain water and other supplies. The Crusaders' high hopes were dashed when they found that Altuntash's wife, made of sterner stuff than her husband, had introduced a Damascene garrison into Bosra's citadel. Unwilling to chance a siege close to an enemy host, Baldwin elected to withdraw.

The Franks suffered even worse on their return march from the heat, dust and constant harassment by the Turks. One day, the Saracens set fire to the dry brush upwind of the Franks, adding to their misery. The Crusaders carried their dead and wounded with them so that their enemies would not be encouraged by their losses. "Any man who left his place in the ranks was threatened with severe penalties." Leaving the ranks without permission was forbidden. However, one exception was that a knight was allowed to rescue a Christian if he was about to be killed by a Muslim.

As the Franks neared their own territories, the Saracens redoubled their attacks on the Latin rearguard, trying to separate it from the rest of the formation. Near the moment of crisis, a Turk fighting with the Crusaders rode out without leave and killed an opponent in personal combat. This so dismayed the Damascenes and encouraged the Franks that "excuses were found for his breach of orders." Ultimately, the Saracens were unable to stop the Crusader army from recrossing the Jordan and safely returning to the Kingdom of Jerusalem. The running battle lasted twelve days.

Aftermath
Baldwin's bid to capture Bosra and Salkhad was a strategic failure. Mu'in ad-Din Unur seized control of both cities soon afterward. The Bosra fight is interesting on two levels. It shows how careful and cautious the Crusader leaders often were, unlike the popular image of impulsive hotheads. It also demonstrates the ability of a well-led Latin host to literally march through its enemies if discipline and fighting power were maintained. The next actions involving Crusaders were the Second Battle of Dorylaeum in late 1147, the Siege of Damascus in 1148 and the Battle of Inab in 1149.

Notes

References

Bosra 1147
Battles involving the Seljuk Empire
Battles of the Second Crusade
Conflicts in 1147
Burid Emirate
1147 in Asia
12th century in the Seljuk Empire
1140s in the Kingdom of Jerusalem
Battles involving the Zengid dynasty